Dadi is a surname. Notable people with the surname include:

 Bilkis Dadi (born 1937/38), Indian activist
 Birtukan Ayano Dadi (born 1975), Ethiopian judge and diplomat
 Eugène Dadi (born 1973), Ivorian footballer
 Firdaus Dadi, Indian actress
 Marcel Dadi (1951–1996), Tunisian-born French guitarist